Walter Bacon may refer to:

Walter Rathbone Bacon (1845–1917), American tramway executive
Walter W. Bacon (1880–1962), American politician from Delaware